The terms Jötunheimr (in Old Norse orthography: Jǫtunheimr ; often anglicised as Jotunheim) or Jötunheimar refer to either a land or multiple lands in Nordic mythology inhabited by the jötnar.  are typically, but not exclusively, presented in Eddic sources as prosperous lands located to the north and are commonly separated from the lands inhabited by gods and humans by barriers that cannot be traversed by usual means.

Etymology
When attested in Eddic sources, the word is typically found in its plural form,  ('-lands').

Attestations

Poetic Edda

 are mentioned in three poems of the Poetic Edda. In the beginning of Völuspá, the coming of three women out of  marks the end of the Age of Gold for the gods. Towards the end of the poem, in the section describing the onset of Ragnarök, they are mentioned as follows:

After his journey, Skírnir meets Gerðr and her family living in a hall and tending to animals in the daylight, protected by a fence and dogs.

The  tells the god that he will only return the hammer in exchange for Freyja's hand in marriage. In this account, Þrymr's estate is presented as wealthy, with him holding dogs on golden leashes and telling that has cattle with golden horns in his stables and many jewels, with Freyja being the only thing he lacked.

Gylfaginning

Skáldskaparmál
Skáldskaparmál tells of how Loki was once coerced into helping the  Þjazi abduct Iðunn who carried her northwards, back to his home in  named Þrymheimr. Upon reaching Iðunn, Loki turned her into a nut and flew away with her in his talons. Þjazi later finds out that Iðunn is gone and he chases after them as an eagle, but is killed as he reached Asgard when he flies into a fire that the gods made.

Angered, Hrungnir chases Odin back to Asgard on his horse Gullfaxi whereupon the gods invite him to drink with them. When the gods tired of his bragging, they called for Thor. One of the pieces flies into Thor's head, becoming stuck.

Position in cosmology
, along with other lands such as Hel, constitute "the otherworld" in Eddic sources that is either journeyed to or from, often leading to a confrontation that forms the basis for the narrative. There is no single location that  are found in Nordic cosmology however, instead being travelled to by a number of different directions and often separated from the lands of humans and gods by a barrier that is difficult to cross such as bodies of water, fells, fire or forests. 

They then travel through a great forest before eventually reaching the hall of Útgarða-Loki. Sometimes  are positioned in specific geographical locations such as Ægir on the island of Læsø.  

It has been proposed that rather than being conceived of as a physical land that can be located geographically relative to the regions of the world inhabited by humans,  should be seen as connected to other realms by a number of passageways that cannot be traversed by ordinary means, and may seem contradictory from a naturalistic viewpoint in that a single location could be reached from a start point in a number of distinct directions. In this model, the  would not be located in these opposing directions, only the passageways by which they are reached. It has been further noted that in Eddic sources, it seems that  are located to some extent in all directions and that they can be reached if one travels sufficiently far away from the area inhabited by people.

See also
 List of jötnar in Norse mythology
 Otherworld

Citations

Bibliography

Primary

Secondary
 
 
 
 
 
 
 

Locations in Norse mythology